Mirkhal  is a village in the southern state of Karnataka, India. It is located in the Basavakalyan taluk of Bidar district.

Demographics
 India census, Mirkhal had a population of 5690 with 2910 males and 2780 females.

See also
 Bidar
 Districts of Karnataka

References

External links
 http://Bidar.nic.in/

Villages in Bidar district